Penny Sue Pritzker (born May 2, 1959) is an American billionaire businesswoman and civic leader who served as the 38th United States secretary of commerce in the Obama administration from 2013 to 2017. She was confirmed by a Senate vote of 97–1.

Pritzker is a member of the prominent Pritzker family and was involved with the family business empire from a young age. She was eventually being appointed as one of three successors to her uncle, Jay Pritzker. She is the founder of PSP Partners, PSP Capital Partners, and Pritzker Realty Group, and co-founder of Artemis Real Estate Partners and Inspired Capital. She is on the board of Microsoft, and chair of the Carnegie Endowment for International Peace. As of October 2021, Forbes estimated her net worth at US$3.2 billion. In 2009, Forbes named Pritzker one of the 100 most powerful women in the world.

Before entering government service, Pritzker had been involved in many Chicago organizations, including the Chicago Board of Education, Museum of Contemporary Art, Chicago, and her own foundation, the Pritzker Traubert Family Foundation. Pritzker was an early supporter of Obama's presidential candidacy, having been a friend of the Obama family since their time in Chicago.

From 2021 to 2022, she was a member of the President’s Council of Advisors on Science and Technology (PCAST).

She is the sister of J. B. Pritzker, the current governor of Illinois.

Early life and education 
Penny Pritzker was born in Chicago in 1959, the daughter of Sue (née Sandel) and Donald Pritzker. She is a member of the Pritzker family of Chicago, a wealthy and influential Jewish business family. Donald Pritzker was one of the co-founders of Hyatt Hotels. He moved the family to Atherton, California, where business for the Hyatt Hotels began to grow. Penny has two younger brothers, Tony ( 1961) and J. B. Pritzker ( 1965), the incumbent Governor of Illinois.

Young Penny would accompany her father to the hotels and check the cleanliness of the ladies restrooms. In 1972, Don died suddenly of a heart attack when Penny was 13years old. Following Don's death, Sue began battling depression, requiring Penny to at times care for her mother and her younger brothers. At age 16, Penny wrote a letter to her grandfather, and head of the family business empire, A.N. Pritzker, in which she asked why he talked business with the men in the family and not with her. Finally realizing Penny's interest in business, A.N. provided her with a summer course in accounting.

Penny attended Castilleja School until 1977. She graduated with a Bachelor of Arts in economics from Harvard College in 1981. The following year, Penny's mother died after falling out of the passenger side of a tow truck. Penny returned to school, earning both a Juris Doctor and an MBA from Stanford University in 1985.

Pritzker family businesses

Early ventures 
After she earned her degrees, Pritzker joined the Pritzker organization encouraged by her cousin Nick Pritzker. In 1987, she founded Classic Residence by Hyatt, later renamed Vi, upscale housing for seniors as an alternative to nursing homes. The project struggled at first, losing $40million in the first 18months, but turned around after changes in marketing and management. In 1991, Jay Pritzker, Penny's uncle and head of the Pritzker family businesses, named Penny as the director of the Pritzkers' non-hotel landholdings. With that appointment, Penny created the Pritzker Realty Group, which developed apartment buildings, shopping centers, and the Baldwin Park neighborhood in Orlando, Florida.

Superior Bank
From 1991 to 1994, Penny Pritzker was chairperson of the Hinsdale, Illinois-based Superior Bank of Chicago, in which Jay Pritzker had purchased a 50% stake from the Federal Deposit Insurance Corporation, who had taken over the bank when it failed. In 1993 the bank "embarked on a business strategy of significant growth into subprime home mortgages", according to a report by the United States Treasury Department. In 2000 it became clear the bank was faltering. In the months leading up to 2001, the Pritzkers tried to work out a recapitalization plan. In July 2001, the FDIC seized the bank after the recapitalization could not be resolved. Subsequently, the Pritzker family reached an agreement with regulators to pay $460million.

According to the FDIC, by 2011 the uninsured depositors of Superior had each received 81% of their uninsured monies, in addition to the $100,000 each previously received of their insured amount. Industry experts have criticized the Pritzkers in regard to Superior. Consumer advocates and government investigators asserted Superior "engaged in unsound financial activities and predatory lending practices". Responding to The Wall Street Journal, Pritzker noted she had no ownership in the bank, either direct or indirect, and that the bank's reasons for failure "were complex, including changes in accounting practices, auditing failures, reversals in regulatory positions and general economic conditions". She said the bank complied with "fair lending laws" and ethical business practices. A 2001 Business Week article described the bank's other owner, Alvin Dworman, as the more dominant partner in its operation as a result of agreements made by Jay Pritzker. Quoted in The New York Times, a Pritzker family friend observed Pritzker was trapped in a deal of her uncle's making: "Penny got sucked into this…this was really the legacy of Jay."

Leadership and dissolution 
In 1995, Penny was named as one of three successors to the retiring Jay Pritzker besides his son Tom and his cousin Nick. Tom was named the official head of the businesses, Nick and Penny each named vice-chairman. Together, the three were to oversee the Pritzker family assets. Jay intended to keep the family business together, devising a system of trusts that would allow individual family members to receive money from the trusts to meet their needs; however, the family's wealth was to be primarily maintained in the trusts to grow the businesses and fund philanthropic endeavors. The Pritzker business empire contained over 200 businesses and was valued at $15billion.

After Jay Pritzker's death in 1999, other Pritzker family members challenged Tom, Nick, and Penny's control of the businesses in multiple lawsuits. Penny's brothers joined in one of the lawsuits. In 2001 Tom, Nick, and Penny decided to sell family assets to allow eleven cousins to receive a share, dissolving the family's business ties. Disentangling the family's business interests took nearly a decade. The family sold its controlling stake in the Marmon Group to Berkshire Hathaway for $4.5billion in 2008. The Pritzker Realty Group sold Parking Spot, an airport parking management business Penny co-founded in 1998, to Green Courte Partners LLC for $360million in 2011.

Starting in 2005, she served as non-executive chairman of TransUnion. In 2009, she co-founded Artemis Real Estate Partners LLC, a real estate investment management company, with Deborah Harmon. In 2011, she founded an investment office, PSP Capital Partners. Altogether, Pritzker started five companies before joining the federal government.

Government and political involvement 
Pritzker's friendship with Barack Obama and his family dates back to the 1990s when he was a professor at the University of Chicago. Pritzker met Obama at a Chicago YMCA where her son participated in a basketball program coached by Obama's brother-in-law Craig Robinson. Obama and his family were frequent guests at Pritzker's Lake Michigan vacation home.

Pritzker was an early supporter of Obama's political career, helping to finance his 2004 Senate campaign. Early in the Democratic presidential primary, Pritzker's financing helped Obama's candidacy survive when Obama was trailing Hillary Clinton in the polls. Pritzker remained a major fundraiser for Obama during the 2008 Democratic primary and raised millions overall for his White House bid. She served as the national finance chair of Obama's 2008 presidential campaign. Under her direction, the campaign reached out to small donors. Pritzker also hosted more lavish fundraisers as part of her effort to raise money.

Following Obama's victory in the 2008 presidential election, CNN reported that Pritzker was president-elect Obama's top choice for Commerce Secretary. However, Pritzker took herself out of the running. According to the Chicago Tribune, she withdrew her name from consideration "due to obligations to her family, for whom she was still overseeing billions in assets, and the financial crisis, which was putting some of those assets at risk". As a result of her public support for President Obama, Pritzker found herself the target of labor groups for Hyatt Hotels' practices. The president of Unite Here cited her connection to Obama as a reason why the group expected her to use better labor practices as the group staged demonstrations against Pritzker.

Pritzker was a member of the President's Council on Jobs and Competitiveness. She also served on the President's Economic Recovery Advisory Board. Although she was less active in the 2012 Obama campaign than she had been four years prior, she served as national co-chair of Obama for America 2012. She was also on the board of directors of the Council on Foreign Relations, a nonpartisan think tank focused on world affairs and U.S. foreign policy.

Secretary of Commerce

Pritzker was nominated as United States Secretary of Commerce by President Barack Obama on May 2, 2013. To avoid conflicts of interest, Pritzker agreed to sell her interest in at least 221 companies and resign from 158 entities, including the Hyatt board of directors and the Chicago Board of Education. Later that month, on May 23, the Senate held its confirmation hearing, which covered a variety of topics. Although Pritzker's family business dealings had been a target of Republican criticism when Obama announced her nomination, only three questions at the hearing related to her family. Pritzker was confirmed by the full Senate on June 25, by a vote of 97 to 1. Pritzker was sworn in as secretary on June 26, 2013.

Among Pritzker's priorities was the Trans-Pacific Partnership (TPP), a proposed trade agreement that would have been the "largest regional trade agreement in history". Pritzker supported the TPP as a way to provide market access to U.S. businesses and as a way for the U.S. to set the standards for trade. Leading up the 2016 presidential election, in which both major party candidates openly opposed the TPP, Pritzker and other Obama officials continued to push for the TPP's passage in Congress. Ultimately, Congress failed to pass the TPP bill.

Pritzker named a Digital Economy Board of Advisors, which included tech industry CEOs and academics, to advise on policy. Pritzker also expanded the IP attache program, which helps the tech industry protect their intellectual property abroad. As secretary, Pritzker also created the Commerce Data Advisory Council to identify priorities for the Department of Commerce, a prolific publisher of data intended to allow businesses to plan and innovate. Pritzker served as the lead negotiator for the United States in the E.U.–U.S. Privacy Shield, an agreement governing how companies transfer digital data from Europe to the United States.

Following President Obama's announcement that the United States would move towards normalizing relations with Cuba, Pritzker traveled to Cuba. Although Obama's change in policy did not end the U.S. trade embargo, since ending the embargo required an act of Congress, Pritzker met with Cuban trade ministers and other officials to discuss the changing relationship between the two countries and to lay the groundwork for more economic involvement.

Following her tenure as secretary, Pritzker returned to PSP and the private sector.

Civic and philanthropic activities 
Pritzker is involved in public education. She was a member of the Chicago Board of Education and is past chair of the Chicago Public Education Fund. Pritzker was elected to a six-year term on the Harvard Board of Overseers in 2002. In 2018, she was elected to the President and Fellows of Harvard College, which oversees Harvard University.  Pritzker was advisory board chair of Skills for America's Future (SAF), a policy initiative of the Aspen Institute. Pritzker is a former chair of the Museum of Contemporary Art, Chicago.

Pritzker and her husband, Bryan Traubert, have their own foundation called the Pritzker Traubert Family Foundation. The foundation focuses on physical activity for young people and increasing economic opportunity in Chicago. Among their initiatives were a $5million donation to converting grass soccer fields to easier-to-maintain turf and a $1million donation to repair tennis courts around Chicago. The Pritzkers also established ChicagoRun, a program that prepares Chicago-area children to run their first 5k race.

In 2012 Chicago magazine named her one of the 100 most powerful Chicagoans. On March 26, 2014, Elle honored Pritzker, with others, at the Italian Embassy in the United States during its annual "Women in Washington Power List".

In February 2018, Pritzker was elected to succeed Harvey V. Fineberg as chairperson of the Carnegie Endowment for International Peace, taking effect May 2018.

In March 2020, Pritzker set up the Illinois COVID-19 Response Fund, to assist non-profit organizations during the COVID-19 pandemic, after receiving a call from her brother, Illinois Governor J. B. Pritzker. The siblings announced the creation of the fund with $23 million in start up money on March 24, 2020, six days after Governor Pritzker's request. Pritzker and her husband contributed $1.5 million of the initial sum.

Personal life 
In the 1980s, Pritzker completed her first Ironman Triathlon in Hawaii. Pritzker trained for six months and ultimately finished the race in 12hours. In addition to competing in triathlons, Pritzker has also run marathons. Pritzker is married to ophthalmologist Bryan Traubert, with whom she has two children. Although her relationship with her brothers became strained following the family business restructuring, they eventually reconciled, and Penny expressed support for the idea of younger brother J.B. running for office in 2017.

See also
Federal Deposit Insurance Corporation
List of female United States Cabinet members
List of people and organisations named in the Paradise Papers
Office of Thrift Supervision

Notes

References

External links 

 About Secretary Penny Pritzker at the United States Department of Commerce
 
 Money Maven
 The Forbes 400 – #135 Penny Pritzker 2007 profile
 The Harvard Crimson – Penny Pritzker  Madeline W. Lissner, June 5, 2006
 SEC filings
 Personal website

1959 births
Living people
20th-century American businesswomen
20th-century American businesspeople
20th-century American philanthropists
20th-century women philanthropists
21st-century American businesswomen
21st-century American businesspeople
21st-century American philanthropists
21st-century women philanthropists
21st-century American politicians
21st-century American women politicians
American billionaires
American business executives
American chairpersons of corporations
American company founders
American financial company founders
American hoteliers
American people of Ukrainian-Jewish descent
American women business executives
American women company founders
American women investors
Businesspeople from Chicago
Carnegie Endowment for International Peace
Castilleja School alumni
Fellows of the American Academy of Arts and Sciences
Female billionaires
Harvard College alumni
Hotel founders
Hyatt people
Illinois Democrats
Members of the Chicago Board of Education
Obama administration cabinet members
People named in the Paradise Papers
Philanthropists from Illinois
Politicians from Chicago
Penny
Jewish American members of the Cabinet of the United States
Stanford Graduate School of Business alumni
Stanford Law School alumni
Stanford University trustees
United States Secretaries of Commerce
Women hoteliers
Women members of the Cabinet of the United States